Stephen Sartarelli (born 1954 in Youngstown, Ohio) is an American poet and translator.

Life
Sartarelli graduated from Antioch College and New York University. Specializing in translations from French and Italian into English, among other things he has translated the popular Inspector Montalbano series of detective novels written by the Italian writer Andrea Camilleri.

Sartarelli lives in France with his wife.

Awards
 1984 Poggioli Translation Award for Horrcynus Orca by Stefano D'Arrigo
 2001 Raiziss/de Palchi Translation Award from The Academy of American Poets for Songbook: The Selected Poems of Umberto Saba.

Works

Poetry

Essays

Translations

Poetry
 Nanni Cagnone, The Book of Giving Back (Edgewise Press, 1997),

Prose
 Death in Florence, by Marco Vichi (Hodder & Stoughton, 2013)
 Prince of the Clouds, by Gianni Riotta (Farrar, Straus & Giroux, 2000).
 The Plague-Sower, by Gesualdo Bufalino (1988).
 The House on Moon Lake, by Francesca Duranti (1985).

References

External links
"Poissonally in poisson" - Interview with Stephen Sartarelli on the Anglo-Italian blog Detective Beyond Borders
Interview with Stephen Sartarelli on the program "Best Medicine" of Australian radio network 88.3 Southern FM

1954 births
Living people
Italian–English translators
American male poets
Antioch College alumni
New York University alumni
French–English translators
20th-century American poets
20th-century American translators
20th-century American male writers
21st-century American poets
21st-century American translators
21st-century American male writers
Writers from Youngstown, Ohio
Poets from Ohio